The Neustadt O.S. district was a Prussian district in Upper Silesia from 1743 to 1945. Its capital was the city of Neustadt. Its territory corresponded roughly to the present-day Prudnik County in the Opole Voivodeship in Poland.

History 
After the conquest of most of Silesia, King Frederick the Great introduced Prussian administrative structures in Lower Silesia in 1742 and in Upper Silesia in 1743. This included the establishment of two war and domain chambers in Breslau and Glogau as well as their division into districts. The district of Neustadt was initially under the War and Domain Chamber of Breslau. In the course of the Prussian Reform Movement, the administrative region of Oppeln was created in the Province of Silesia, which included the Neustadt district.

During the district reform of January 1, 1818, the district boundaries were changed as follows:
 The villages of Berndau, Damasko, Gläsen, Kasimir, Schönau, Steubendorf and Thomnitz were transferred from the Neustadt district to the Leobschütz district.
 The villages of Oberwitz and Roswadze were transferred from the Neustadt district to the Groß Strehlitz district.
 The villages of Dobersdorf and Malckwitz were transferred from the Oppeln district to the Neustadt district.

From 1871, the district belonged to the German Empire. On November 8, 1919, the province of Silesia was dissolved and the new province of Upper Silesia was formed from Regierungsbezirk Oppeln. In the Upper Silesia plebiscite held on March 20, 1921, 88.2% of voters in the Neustadt district voted for Germany and 11.8% voted for Poland. Therefore, the district remained in the German Reich.

After World War II, the district became part of Poland under the terms of the Potsdam Agreement.

Demographics 
According to the Prussian census of 1840, the district had a population of 68,677, of which 35,476 (51.7%) were Germans and 33,201 (48.3%) were Poles.

References 
Famous People

Rainer Winkler

Province of Silesia

Neustadt O.S.
Prudnik County
States and territories established in 1743
1743 establishments in Europe
1740s establishments in Prussia
States and territories disestablished in 1945
1945 disestablishments in Germany
1945 disestablishments in Poland
1940s disestablishments in Prussia